Juan D. Arias (born May 6, 1938, in Marin, Yaracuy, Venezuela) is a retired Thoroughbred horse trainer best known for race conditioning Canonero II to win the 1971 Kentucky Derby and Preakness Stakes in the United States. Canonero II would be voted the Eclipse Award as the 1971 American Champion Three-Year-Old Male Horse.

Arias grew up in poverty on a farm in central Venezuela. As a child, he had hoped to become a pilot in the Venezuelan air force but suffered a hernia which prevented him from going into the training program. Instead, aged fifteen, he became an apprentice to a local horse trainer, and two years later was accepted into the trainers school at La Rinconada, a race track in Caracas, and received his training licence on 4 July 1959.

References

1938 births
People from Yaracuy
Horse trainers
Venezuelan sportspeople
Living people
20th-century Venezuelan people
21st-century Venezuelan people